Kante is a surname of African origin. Alternative spellings include Kanté and Kant. Notable people with the surname include:

Cédric Kanté (born 1979), Malian football player
Djibril Kante (born 1980), American basketball player
Ibrahim Kante (born 1981), Malian football player
José Kanté (born 1990), Guinean professional footballer born in Spain 
Mory Kanté (1950-2020), Guinean-Malian vocalist
N'Golo Kanté (born 1991), French football player 
Solomana Kante (1922–1987), Guinean writer